The Cautín (Rio Cautín) is a river in Chile. It rises on the western slopes of the Cordillera de Las Raíces and flows in La Araucanía Region. The river's main tributary is the Quepe River. The city of Temuco is located on the Cautín River.

See also
 List of rivers of Chile

References 

Rivers of Araucanía Region
Rivers of Chile